Xin Zhou is a mathematician known for his contributions in scattering theory, integrable systems, random matrices and Riemann–Hilbert problems.

He is Professor Emeritus of Mathematics at Duke University. Zhou had obtained M.Sc. from the University of the Chinese Academy of Sciences in 1982 and then got his Ph.D. in 1988 from the University of Rochester. He received the Pólya prize in 1998 and was awarded with the Guggenheim Fellowship in 1999. He is most well known for his work with Percy Deift on the steepest descent method for oscillatory Riemann–Hilbert problems.

References

20th-century births
Living people
Mathematical analysts
Duke University faculty
University of Rochester alumni
American people of Chinese descent
Year of birth missing (living people)